François Barrois (16th century) was a French scientific instrument maker.

Provost of Vaucouleurs (Lorraine), François Barrois was active in the second half of the sixteenth century. He wrote a treatise entirely dedicated to the description of his compass, specifically developed for surveying: La Fabrique et ... la pratique du Compas Barrois ... (Paris, 1598).

External links 
La Fabrique et ... la pratique du Compas Barrois ...'' (Paris, 1598) at Google Books

French scientific instrument makers
16th-century French scientists
Year of birth missing
Year of death missing
People from Vaucouleurs